Drumsurn railway station served Drumsurn in County Londonderry in Northern Ireland.

The Londonderry and Coleraine Railway opened the station on 4 July 1883.

It closed on 1 January 1933.

Routes

References

Disused railway stations in County Londonderry
Railway stations opened in 1883
Railway stations closed in 1933
Railway stations in Northern Ireland opened in the 19th century